Minolops corallina, common name the coral red top shell, is a species of sea snail, a marine gastropod mollusk in the family Solariellidae.

Distribution
This marine species occurs off South Australia and Western Australia.

References

 Cotton, B.C. & Godfrey, F.K. 1935. South Australian Shells. Part 15. South Australian Naturalist 16(3): 34-41
 Cotton, B.C. 1959. South Australian Mollusca. Archaeogastropoda. Handbook of the Flora and Fauna of South Australia. Adelaide : South Australian Government Printer 449 pp

External links

Gastropods of Australia
corallina
Gastropods described in 1935